Isocentris rubralis is a moth in the family Crambidae. It was described by Swinhoe in 1906. It is found in India (Khasia Hills).

References

Moths described in 1906
Pyraustinae